Bogalusa High School (BHS) is the high school of the Bogalusa City Schools district.  It is located in Bogalusa, Louisiana, United States.

The district serves the City of Bogalusa, Rio, and some unincorporated areas.

History
On Tuesday April 17, a day after the Virginia Tech Massacre a Bogalusa man passed a note to a Bogalusa student making threatening remarks about a mass killing similar to the incident at Virginia Tech.

School information

Schedule information
Bogalusa High School uses a 7-period day.

Technology courses
Bogalusa High School is one of the schools in the nation now adapting to online courses, which are currently limited to LVS Algebra, which is done using Blackboard. LVS Algebra is an optional course to those who wish to join it, and currently has a vast majority of students enrolled into it.

JROTC
Bogalusa High school is also home to the JROTC "Lumberjack Battalion." The school currently holds the "Honor Unit with Distinction" award. The school colors are the colors of the senior ropes, and they are an Army JROTC organization. They also have 3 different afterschool teams: Drill Team, Rifle Team, and Color Guard.

Athletics
Bogalusa High athletics competes in the LHSAA.

Championships
'Football championships
(1) State Championships: 1947, 1969

Notable alumni

Ben Nevers (born 1946), Class of 1964, state senator from Washington Parish
Henry "Tank" Powell (born 1945), Class of 1963, insurance agent, state representative from Tangipahoa Parish (1996–2008), and member of the Louisiana Board of Pardons.
Harold Ritchie (born 1949), Class of 1967, state representative for District 75 since 2004
Javarious Scott (Jaydayoungan) (born 1998), Rapper/Musician, Scott is a professional rapper who attended Bogalusa High School but did not graduate. His songs such as "23 Island", "Elimination", and "Thot Thot" have amassed millions of views on multiple music streaming platforms.
Tom Thornhill (born 1952) Class of 1970, Slidell attorney and member of the Louisiana House of Representatives from 1996-2000

References

External links
District Web site

Public high schools in Louisiana
Schools in Washington Parish, Louisiana
1951 establishments in Louisiana